Wardville may refer to the following places:

Wardville, Oklahoma
Wardville, Texas
Wardville, New Zealand